A government trifecta is a political situation in which the same political party controls the executive branch and both chambers of the legislative branch in countries that have a bicameral legislature and an executive that is not fused. The term is primarily used in the United States, where the term originated—being borrowed from horse race betting—but also in Argentina, Australia, Bolivia, Brazil, Chile, Colombia, and France. 

Most countries and all democracies have some degree of separation of powers into separate branches of government, typically consisting of an executive, a legislative, and a judicial branch, but the term government trifecta is primarily applied to countries in which the executive is not elected by the legislature and where the legislature is not sovereign; in parliamentary systems, the executive or part of it is elected by the legislature and must have the support of the majority of Parliament.

Government trifectas are seen as beneficial by some and as undesirable by others. Those in favor argue that government trifectas are efficient and avoid gridlocks. Opponents argue that trifectas discourage policing of those in power by the opposition and that they do not limit spending and the expansion of undesirable laws. Opponents also argue that government trifectas do not tend to lead to compromise since one party can simply implement its goals unopposed. Consequently, the incumbent party may alter the structure of executive agencies to prepare for when it is bound to lose its incumbency. These alterations are performed to secure control over the agencies for when the party is no longer incumbent. Examples of these include political appointments that extend beyond the political cycle, contract or grant awards, and debt issuances.

The situation is common in developing nations but rare in developed ones. Early in the 20th century, for example, government trifectas were common in the United States, but they have become increasingly rare since the 1970s. State government trifectas have become more common since the 2010s, going from 24 states having trifectas to 36 in 2020.

Government trifectas are contrasted by divided governments—a situation in which one party controls the executive branch while another party controls one or both houses of the legislative branch.

In systems that use fusion of powers and where the executive has to rely on the confidence of the legislature, the executive is almost always composed of members of the party or coalition that controls the lower house of the legislature, essentially creating a situation where there always is a government trifecta, assuming the upper chamber is in the same party's control. If there is no government trifecta a legislature may pass a motion of no confidence to force the government to resign, thereby giving the legislature the power to create a government trifecta and making government trifectas not as significant compared to systems that use separation of powers, since one has to wait for a new election to establish or abolish a government trifecta.

Asia-Oceania

Australia
The term is used in Australia, where the government level consists of the government (lead by the Prime Minister and Cabinet) and the Parliament with two chambers (the House of Representatives and the Senate).

Europe

France
The term is used in France, where the government level consists of the president and the Congress of French Parliament with two chambers (the National Assembly and the Senate).

North America

United States

The term is primarily used in the United States, where the federal government level consists of the president and the Congress with its two chambers (the House and the Senate). 

Because of the coattail effect, most newly elected presidents have a majority with them in both chambers of Congress. The six-year itch conversely means that the last two years of a two-term president rarely have trifectas. The most recent federal trifecta was held by the Democratic Party from January 20, 2021 to January 3, 2023.

State government trifectas
At the state level, a trifecta means that one party holds the governorship and both legislative houses. The sole exception is in Nebraska, where there is a unicameral legislature.

Sources:

A visual representation of US state government trifectas over time:

South America

Argentina
The term is used in Argentina, where the government level consists of the president and the Congress with two chambers (the Chamber of Deputies and the Senate).

Bolivia
The term is used in Bolivia, where the government level consists of the president and the Plurinational Legislative Assembly with two chambers (the Chamber of Deputies and the Senate).

Brazil
The term is used in Brazil, where the government level consists of the president and the Congress with two chambers (the Chamber of Deputies and the Federal Senate).

Chile
The term is used in Chile, where the government level consists of the president and the Congress of Chile with two chambers (the Chamber of Deputies and the Senate).

Colombia
The term is used in Colombia, where the government level consists of the president and the Congress of Colombia with two chambers (the Chamber of Representatives and the Senate).

See also
 Two-party system
 Dominant-party system

Notes

References

External links
 State government trifectas at Ballotpedia.

Political science terminology